Worth Township is one of seventeen townships in Boone County, Iowa, USA.  As of the 2000 census, its population was 655.

History
Worth Township was organized in 1858. It is named for William J. Worth.

Geography
According to the USGS, it contains four cemeteries: Hull, James Gildea, Sarah Dinwoodie and Squire Boone.

References

External links
 US-Counties.com
 City-Data.com

Townships in Boone County, Iowa
Townships in Iowa
1858 establishments in Iowa